The James T. Vaughn Correctional Center (JTVCC), formerly the Delaware Correctional Center (DCC), is a state prison for men in unincorporated New Castle County, Delaware, USA, near Smyrna. It is the Delaware Department of Correction's largest correctional facility.

JTVCC houses some 2,500 minimum, medium, and maximum security inmates. It is also the primary facility for housing the Kent County pre-trial (detainee) population.

Before the abolition of capital punishment in Delaware, the state's death row for men was located here. The death row for women was located in the Delores J. Baylor Women's Correctional Institution. Executions occurred at JTVCC.

The facility is named for former Delaware State Senator James T. Vaughn, who died in 2007.

History
In 1996, construction began on a $110 million, 888-bed addition which included 600 maximum security cells in six units. The new addition houses the Security Housing Unit (SHU) and the Medium Housing Unit (MHU).

Inmates in the SHU, which formerly included the prison's death row, occupy single-bunked cells in which they are locked down and receive seventeen and a half hours a week out of their cell for recreational purposes. Inmates may earn their way out of the SHU through good behavior.

In 2015, the prison became a subject of an ACLU lawsuit, due to the use of solitary confinement for mentally ill inmates. Further lawsuits have been filed due to the Delaware State Correction's decision to feed some inmates "baked slop," while other states have discontinued the use of such meals.

Incidents
On July 12, 2004, 45-year-old inmate Scott Miller, armed with a shank, took a 27-year-old female prison counselor hostage. Miller raped the woman whom he held for seven hours before being shot and killed. Miller, a convicted serial rapist, was serving a 694-year sentence at the time.

On February 1, 2017, inmates took control of Building C, initially holding five correctional officers as hostages according to media reports. This building houses about 100 inmates. The incident was first reported by a correctional officer's radio call for "immediate assistance" at 10:38 a.m. The prison, and all other prisons within Delaware, were placed on lockdown. One hostage was released a few hours later, and taken to a hospital with 'non-life threatening' injuries. Later that evening, two other hostages were reportedly released. When the hostage situation ended, one hostage, identified as correctional officer and 16-year veteran Sgt. Steven Floyd, was killed and another was injured. The incident led to a proposal to reinstate the death penalty in Delaware.

Notable inmates
 Thomas Capano
 Billy Glaze
 Steven Brian Pennell
 Earl Bradley (Previously in Vaughn's SHU - in 2016 he was moved to a prison out of state)
 Jerome Franks

References

External links

 James T. Vaughn Correctional Center
Delaware execution chamber photo

1971 establishments in Delaware
Prisons in Delaware
Capital punishment in Delaware
Buildings and structures in New Castle County, Delaware
Execution sites in the United States